The Miss República Dominicana 2005 was held on April 9, 2005. That year, only 46 candidates competed for the national crown. Five candidates withdrew before the competition started. The chosen winner represented the Dominican Republic at the Miss Universe 2005 pageant which was held in Bangkok, Thailand. 19 Provinces, 21 Municipalities and 2 Dominican Communities had entered.

Results

 Tie for 4th Runner-Up

Delegates
Candidates that have ** withdrawn before competition

External links
Miss RD 2005
Fotos de Miss RD '05

Miss Dominican Republic
2005 beauty pageants
2005 in the Dominican Republic